Four Seasons Guitar Quartet is an Iranian ensemble formed  in 2010. It consists of Vahid Vahidpour, Fereydoon Vaziri, Adel Shahandeh and Farokh Karnama. Some of their repertoire consists of their arrangements.

Discography
 One Two Three Four, Release date, March 17, 2015: the album contained two suite and five pieces which three of them has been arranged by Adel Shahandeh and one by Farokh Karnama for guitar quartet ensemble.

Activities
performing in the 27th Fajr International Music Festival in 2012
performing in the 28th Fajr International Music Festival in 2013
performing in the 30th Fajr International Music Festival in 2015
performing at Faculty of Arts and Architecture, Azad University of Tehran in 2012
performing at Tehran Roudaki Hall in 2012 (Classical guitar workshop week)
performing in the 11th Khuzestan music festival as guest
and performing several concerts in Ahvaz

References

Musical quartets
Classical guitar ensembles
Musical groups established in 2010
2010 establishments in Iran